Abell 1835 is a galaxy cluster in the Abell catalogue. It is a cluster that also gravitational lenses more-distant background galaxies to make them visible to astronomers.  The cluster has a red shift of around 75,900 km/s and spans 12.

In 2004, one of the galaxies lensed by this cluster was proposed to be the most distant galaxy known, Galaxy Abell 1835 IR1916.

See also
Abell 2218
List of Abell clusters

References

External links
 

Galaxy clusters
Virgo (constellation)
1835
Abell richness class 0